Eteobalea teucrii is a moth in the family Cosmopterigidae. It is found in Spain and Morocco.

The wingspan is about 22 mm. The forewings are bronzy black with three white dorsal patches. The hindwings are shining, leaden grey. Adults are on wing from September to the beginning of October.

The larvae form galls on Teucrium fruticans. They are white without markings and a black head. They reach a length of about 11 mm.

References

Moths described in 1907
Eteobalea